McCartney III ("III" being stylised on the front cover as the three pips of a die) is the 18th solo album by English musician Paul McCartney, released on 18 December 2020 by Capitol Records. It serves as a continuation to his solo albums McCartney (1970) and McCartney II (1980). Similar to those albums, McCartney III features McCartney on all instruments (except drums and guitar on "Slidin'", developed from material recorded during the making of Egypt Station). It became McCartney's first UK number-one solo album since Flowers in the Dirt in 1989, and debuted at number two on the US Billboard 200 albums chart. The album received a nomination at the 64th Annual Grammy Awards for "Best Rock Album", along with "Find My Way" for "Best Rock Song". In 2022, the album was packaged with McCartney and McCartney II as part of the McCartney I II III box set.

Background 
McCartney III was recorded in early 2020 at McCartney's studio in Sussex, England while in lockdown during the COVID-19 pandemic. McCartney began by recording the instrument on which he wrote the song, then adding further layers. He said: "It was a lot of fun. It was about making music for yourself rather than making music that has to do a job. So, I just did stuff I fancied doing. I had no idea this would end up as an album."

As on previous McCartney albums, McCartney played all the instruments himself. He had also played most of the instruments on his 2005 album Chaos and Creation in the Backyard (described at the time by journalist David Hajdu as being "essentially McCartney III") and on his 2007 album Memory Almost Full. McCartney also played all the instruments on the Fireman albums Rushes (1998) and Electric Arguments (2008).

The album's cover art and typography was designed by artist Ed Ruscha, an acquaintance of the McCartney family.

Promotion 
The domain name mccartneyiii.com was registered on 28 August 2020 by CSC Corporate Domains, the company that previously registered paulmccartney.com and flaming-pie.com (for the reissue of Flaming Pie, McCartney's 1997 studio album). Its landing page originally appeared with a 303 error notice, instead of the usual 404 error notice.

On 16 October, teasers for the album started appearing on the streaming service Spotify with animations over the artwork for McCartney and McCartney II showing a die with three pips facing upwards. The following week, McCartney's Twitter account started posting photos at 33 minutes past the hour with a recurring motif of three. On 21 October, McCartney's social media channels officially announced the forthcoming release of the album on 11 December. On 19 November, it was announced that due to unforeseeable production delays, the album release date had to be moved back one week to 18 December.

Starting from 4 December 2020, McCartney sent via his Facebook page the first post of a series of 12 daily posts unveiling the titles of each of the 11 new tracks from his new album through murals painted in 12 different cities all over the world. Each mural is showing the title of a new track, an excerpt from its music score and its author (Paul McCartney) along with the album title and its release date. McCartney also asked all musicians to post their video covers of his 11 new songs through his special website #12DaysOfPaul.

During his appearance on The Howard Stern Show on 15 December 2020, McCartney revealed that American singer-songwriter Taylor Swift originally decided to postpone the release of her album Evermore by one week to respect the original 11 December release date of his album. Upon learning this, McCartney decided to release his album on 18 December instead so that Swift could move forward with the rollout of Evermore as initially planned.

On 17 December, a day before the album release, two live appearances were revealed for that day: one on The Tonight Show Starring Jimmy Fallon and a YouTube Released special featuring Chris Rock, alongside the release date for the lead single "Find My Way", which was released at the same time as the album.

In November 2021 a mini-documentary about the creation of the previous year's Third Man Records 333 edition of McCartney III using recycled McCartney and McCartney II records was released.

Release 
McCartney III was released on 18 December 2020 on CD, vinyl, cassette and digital formats, although some Japanese stores hadn't been notified of the postponement of the album, and released it on the 11th. The vinyl editions include a variety of colours: standard black, Third Man Records exclusive yellow-with-black-dots limited to 333 copies, Third Man Records exclusive red limited to 3,000 copies, #SpotifyFansFirst 130g Coke-bottle clear vinyl limited to 3,000 copies worldwide, 130g yellow limited to 3,000 copies worldwide, 130g violet limited to 3,000 copies worldwide, Newbury Comics exclusive pink limited to 1,500 copies, Target exclusive green, uDiscover exclusive orange, selected retailers exclusive blue, other record stores exclusive white.

In November 2021, an additional edition of Third Man Records exclusive vinyl was released: yellow with black splatter, it was limited to 3,333 copies.

Commercial performance 
McCartney III had strong sales internationally. The album debuted at number one on the UK Albums Chart on 25 December 2020, marking his first number-one solo album in his home country in 31 years (since 1989's Flowers in the Dirt). The album reached the top spot by selling 33,079 album-equivalent units. The album also reached the top 10 of many other European markets.

In the US, the album debuted at number two on the Billboard 200 with 107,000 equivalent album units – of which 104,000 were album sales – behind Taylor Swift's Evermore. The placement earned McCartney the feat of being the first artist to have a new album at the top or second-top of the chart in each of the last six decades. McCartney III was also the top-selling album in its debut week in the US, outselling Swift's Evermore and Eminem's Music to Be Murdered By – Side B in pure sales (not including equivalent album units). The album also recorded the third largest US vinyl sales week since Nielsen SoundScan tracking era began in 1991.

Critical reception 

At Metacritic, which assigns a normalised rating out of 100 to reviews from professional publications, McCartney III has an average score of 81, based on 23 reviews, indicating "universal acclaim". Aggregator AnyDecentMusic? gives it 7.6 out of 10, based on their assessment of the critical consensus.

Writing for The Guardian, Alexis Petridis states that McCartney's "lockdown LP has his best songs in years" and that the album "is the most straightforwardly enjoyable and certainly the most personal McCartney album since 2005’s haunted, twilit Chaos and Creation in the Backyard". Rob Sheffield of Rolling Stone wrote that McCartney III "recalls the pastoral, laid-back sound of his 1970 solo debut" and describes the album as a "playful gem". In his album review for NME, Mark Beaumont calls the LP a "stellar return to his three-decade-spanning series". Helen Brown of The Independent stated that "Melodic charm, craftsmanship and open-minded optimism make this solo album a real treat" and describes the album as "Weird, wonderful and whimsical", with McCartney on "inspirational form".

McCartney III Imagined

Announced on 11 March 2021, McCartney released the remix album McCartney III Imagined. Described as an album of "reinterpretations, remixes, and covers" of songs from McCartney III, it became available on streaming services on 16 April and was released on physical media by 23 July. The album includes Dominic Fike's version of "The Kiss of Venus", which was issued as its first single, with Beck's track and EOB's remix being the subsequent singles. The selection of tracks was curated by McCartney himself, featuring "friends, fans, and brand new acquaintances".

Reissues 

The album was reissued on 5 August 2022 in a boxset entitled McCartney I II III, consisting of 3 LPs or 3 CDs, along with the first and second albums of the trilogy.

Track listing 
All tracks written by Paul McCartney.

 "Long Tailed Winter Bird" – 5:16
 "Find My Way" – 3:54
 "Pretty Boys" – 3:00
 "Women and Wives" – 2:52
 "Lavatory Lil" – 2:22
 "Slidin'" – 3:23
 "Deep Deep Feeling" – 8:25
 "The Kiss of Venus" – 3:06
 "Seize the Day" – 3:20
 "Deep Down" – 5:52
 "Winter Bird / When Winter Comes" – 3:12

Note: On vinyl editions of the album, the positions of "Slidin'" and "Deep Deep Feeling" are swapped. The former starts side two, while the latter ends side one.

Personnel 
Sources

Musicians
 Paul McCartney – vocals, all instrumentation except where noted
 Rusty Anderson – electric guitar (track 7)
 Abe Laboriel Jr. – drums (track 7)

Production
 Steve Orchard – engineer
 Greg Kurstin – co-producer (track 7)
 Keith Smith – assistant engineer at Hogg Hill Mill
 Alex Pasco – engineer (track 7)
 Bob Kraushaar – engineer (track 11)
 Randy Merrill – mastering at Sterling Sound
 George Martin – co-producer (track 11)

Artwork
 Ed Ruscha – cover art and typography
 Mary McCartney – cover portrait, photography
 Sonny McCartney – photography
 Nick Steinhardt – art direction and design
 Brian Clarke – stained glass

Charts

Weekly charts

Year-end charts

Notes

References

External links

2020 albums
Albums produced by Paul McCartney
Paul McCartney albums
Capitol Records albums
Sequel albums